Millicent Ellison Brown is an American civil rights activist and educator best known for being one of the first people to racially integrate public schools in Charleston, South Carolina in 1963. She also founded the "Somebody Had to Do It" project.

Early life 
Millicent Brown was born in 1948 in Charleston, South Carolina. Her father was Joseph Arthur Brown, a real-estate broker and the NAACP president in Charleston and South Carolina. After the decision in Brown v. Board of Education in 1954, Brown's family, among other African American families, began the process of enrolling their children in public schools. After pushback, Brown's family filed a lawsuit in 1959 with Brown's sister as the lead plaintiff. The lawsuit was met with opposition from white people in South Carolina. In August 1963, the judge ruled that Black children could integrate into Charleston public schools but only permitted the plaintiffs to enroll that fall rather than all Black students.

High school
Brown, along with Jackie Ford, another African-American child, entered Rivers High School in 1963 as the first two Black children to attend the school. During their time at the school, Brown and Ford would have to endure racism and bullying from their white peers, causing emotional trauma. Despite this, Brown continued on to graduate.

Career 
After finishing high school, Brown went on to graduate from the College of Charleston with a B.A. in History in 1975, The Citadel with a M.Ed. in Education in 1978, and a PhD in U.S. History from Florida State University. She additionally taught at multiple schools. She  wrote her dissertation while at Florida State University on the history of civil rights in Charleston from 1940 to 1970.

Brown serves on South Carolina's ACLU Board of Directors and as the state's representative to the national ACLU. She is a consultant for race relations and diversity issues and speaks at public schools with the College of Charleston's Avery Research Center.

Somebody Had to Do It Project 
In 2006, Brown created the Somebody Had to Do It Project with the intent to share the story of other "first children" who integrated schools in the US, focusing on their physical and emotional experiences.

Awards 
Chester C. Travelstead Award for Courage in Education (2017)
 Commitment to Justice Award (2021)

References 

1948 births
College of Charleston alumni
Florida State University alumni
American civil rights activists
American women educators
Living people
The Citadel, The Military College of South Carolina alumni